Santa Maria della Sanità also known as dei Crociferi, is a late-Baroque or Rococo style, Roman Catholic church located on Via Durini #19 in Milan, in the region of Lombardy in Italy.

History 
The church was commissioned by the Camillian order, who were also known as the Crociferi, and design of the church with its five chapels was originally by Giovanni Battista Quadrio. The undulating facade, described as a violoncello and with a roofline in the shape of the late 18th century marshal's bicorn hat, was designed by Carlo Federico Pietrasanta. The facade remains in brick, and never finished with marble decoration.

The adjacent Collegio of the Camillians was privatized when the order was suppressed in 1799 and is now divided into apartments.

Inside the church, Ferdinando Porta painted the St Joseph in Agony
and Pietro Maggi painted the Assumption of the Virgin in the choir.

References 

Roman Catholic churches completed in 1708
18th-century Roman Catholic church buildings in Italy
Maria della Sanita
Maria della Sanita
1708 establishments in Italy